Trevor Midgley (birth registered first ¼ 1957) is an English former professional rugby league footballer who played in the 1970s.

Background
Trevor Midgley's birth was registered in Wakefield district, West Riding of Yorkshire, England.

Playing career

Challenge Cup Final appearances
Trevor Midgley was an unused  interchange/substitute in Wakefield Trinity's 3-12 defeat by Widnes in the 1979 Challenge Cup Final during the 1978–79 season at Wembley Stadium, London on Saturday 5 May 1979, in front of a crowd of a crowd of 94,218.

References

External links
Statistics at rugbyleagueproject.org

1957 births
Living people
English rugby league players
Rugby league players from Wakefield
Rugby league centres
Rugby league fullbacks
Wakefield Trinity players